Rho associated coiled-coil containing protein kinase 2 is a protein that in humans is encoded by the ROCK2 gene.
Fasudil is an inhibitor of ROCK protein.

Function

The protein encoded by this gene is a serine/threonine kinase that regulates cytokinesis, smooth muscle contraction, the formation of actin stress fibers and focal adhesions, and the activation of the c-fos serum response element. This protein, which is an isozyme of ROCK1 is a target for the small GTPase Rho.

References

Further reading

External links